The Buccaneers is an upcoming British period drama television series written by Katherine Jakeways, based on the unfinished novel of the same name by American novelist Edith Wharton, published posthumously in 1938.

Premise
The arrival of a group of American women into 1870s London results in a culture clash, with the two differing approaches to tradition. This series was previously adapted for BBC television as a mini-series from 1995.

Cast
 Kristine Froseth as Nan St. George
 Alisha Boe as Conchita Closson
 Josie Totah as Mabel Elmsworth
 Aubri Ibrag as Lizzy Elmsworth
 Imogen Waterhouse as Jinny St. George
 Mia Threapleton as Honoria Marable
 Christina Hendricks as Mrs. St. George
 Josh Dylan as Lord Richard Marable
 Barney Fishwick as Lord James Seadown
 Guy Remmers as Theo, The Duke of Tintagel
 Matthew Broome as Guy Thwarte
 Simone Kirby as Laura Testvalley
 Francesca Corney as Jean Hopeleigh

Production
It was announced in June 2022 that Apple TV+ had ordered the series from the Forge Entertainment, with Katherine Jakeways set to write the adaptation and Susanna White attached as lead director. Jakeways and White would also executive produce the series with Beth Willis and George Faber of the Forge Entertainment.

The cast were included in the series order announcement; Kristine Froseth, Alisha Boe, Josie Totah, Aubri Ibrag, Imogen Waterhouse and Mia Threapleton would star as the titular Buccaneers. In July, Christina Hendricks, Josh Dylan, Barney Fishwick, Guy Remmers and Matthew Broome were added to the cast. Simone Kirby joined the cast in October as the girls' chaperone.

Principal photography for the series began in June 2022 in Scotland. Glasgow also doubled as 1870s New York City. Cast and crew were spotted filming around the Glasgow City Chambers in July.

References

External links

Apple TV+ original programming
Upcoming drama television series
Costume drama television series
Mass media portrayals of the upper class
Television shows based on American novels
Television shows filmed in Scotland
Television shows set in London
Television series set in the 1870s